Ultimate Duck Hunting is a duck hunting video game developed by American studio Mid Carolina Media for Windows. The goal of the game is to shoot ducks and then collect them with hunting dogs, a concept similar to that of the classic NES game, Duck Hunt. On October 19, 2007 a Nintendo Wii version was released by publisher Detn8; touted as the new-found company's first title, it was originally planned for release in July 2007, but it was delayed to October due to the E3 announcement of the Wii port.

Critical reception

References

External links
Official site
Ultimate Duck Hunting at GameSpot

2006 video games
Hunting video games
Video games about birds
Video games developed in the United States
Windows games
Wii games
Torque (game engine) games